Ferdinando Arborio Gattinara di Breme (or François de Brême, or François Gattineau de Brême,  or Ferdinando Arborio di Gattinara), Duc de Sartirana Lomellina, marquis de Breme (30 April 1807 in Milan – 23 January 1869 in Florence) was an Italian naturalist and entomologist who specialised in Coleoptera and Diptera. 
He was a “sénateur” of the Société entomologique de France and president of that society in 1844.

Works
Essai Monographique et Iconographique de la Tribu des Cossyphides. Paris : Lacheze (1842).
  Note sur le genre Ceratitis de Macleay. Ann. Soc. Entomol. de France 11: 183-90(1842).

Sources
Cesare Conci et Roberto Poggi (1996), Iconography of Italian Entomologists, with essential biographical data. Memorie della Società entomologica Italiana, 75 : 159-382.
French Wikipedia (Translation)

Italian entomologists
Dipterists
1807 births
1869 deaths
Presidents of the Société entomologique de France
Nobility from Milan
19th-century Italian zoologists
Scientists from Milan